The Mindanao Geothermal Production Field also known as the Mount Apo Geothermal Power Plant is located in Barangay Ilomavis, Kidapawan City, North Cotabato near the foot of Mount Apo with a power output of 106 MW, currently part of the Mindanao Grid that supplies electricity to Kidapawan and Davao Region.

Impounds: Mount Apo

Turbines: Dry Steam Power Plant 54.24 megawatts

References

External links

 Reservoir Management in Mindanao Geothermal Production Field PNOC Energy Development Corporation, 2002

Geothermal power stations in the Philippines
Buildings and structures in Kidapawan